The Second Michigan Territorial Council was a meeting of the legislative body governing Michigan Territory, known formally as the Legislative Council of the Territory of Michigan. The council met in Detroit in two regular sessions between November 2, 1826, and April 13, 1827, during the term of Lewis Cass as territorial governor.

Leadership and organization 

Abraham Edwards was president of the council; John P. Sheldon, Edmund A. Brush, and Randall S. Rice clerks; and William Meldrum sergeant-at-arms.

Members 

A February 5, 1825, act of the United States Congress expanded the size of the council from 9 to 13 members. Members were appointed by the president of the United States, with the advice and consent of the Senate, from a list of 26 people chosen in a general election. 
The council apportioned the 26 people, and thus the 13 seats,
among the territory's counties in an act on April 13, 1825.

Notes

References 
 
 
 
 

002
1826 in Michigan Territory
1827 in Michigan Territory
Michigan
Michigan